is a Professor of Psychology at the College of Letters, Ritsumeikan University, Kyoto, Japan.

In 1984, he received a BSc from the Department of Biology, University of Tsukuba, Tsukuba, Japan, where he studied animal psychology (burrowing behavior in rats) and (at the Tokyo Metropolitan Institute for Neuroscience) neuronal activity of the inferotemporal cortex in macaque monkeys.

After his 1991 PhD from the Institute of Psychology, University of Tsukuba, he specialized in visual perception and visual illusions of geometrical shape, brightness, color, in motion illusions and other visual phenomena like Gestalt completion and Perceptual transparency, based on a modern conception of Gestalt Psychology.

He became renowned through his Rotating Snakes peripheral drift illusion (see above).

In 2006, he received the Gold Prize of the 9th L'ORÉAL Art and Science of Color contest.

In 2007, he received the Award for Original Studies from the Japanese Society of Cognitive Psychology.

In 2008, his designs were the inspiration for the experimental pop band Animal Collective's critically acclaimed album, Merriweather Post Pavilion, which features a leaf covered optical illusion.

He was asked by Jeff Koons to provide illusions for the interior packaging of Lady Gaga's 2013 album Artpop, and a version of his "Hatpin urchin" image appears on the CD itself.

References

External links 

 "Rotating snakes"  can be downloaded for non-commercial purposes from the website (RIKEN institute project)
 Akiyoshi's illusion pages  

Japanese non-fiction writers
Japanese psychologists
Academic staff of Ritsumeikan University
University of Tsukuba alumni
1961 births
Living people